Máel Coluim Ua Brolcháin was a medieval Irish bishop.

He was bishop of Ard Macha" (Armagh) in the Annals of Ulster, but probably took care over the See of Cinél nEógain. Brolcháin was consecrated on 13 September 1107. He died at Derry in 1122.

References

People from County Londonderry
12th-century Roman Catholic bishops in Ireland
Bishops of Cinél nEógain
1122 deaths